The Miss Indiana Teen USA  competition is the pageant that selects the representative for the state of Indiana in the Miss Teen USA pageant. This pageant is currently produced by CROWN MOXIE, LLC headed by JScot Reid. It was formerly produced by MOXIE Media Productions and Sanders & Associates based in Buckhannon, West Virginia before MOXIE Media Productions.

Indiana had a slow start at Miss Teen USA, and did not place until 1991. That placement became the first of a four-year streak, which included three semi-finalist and one 1st runner-up placings.

Six Indiana teens have gone on to win the Miss Indiana USA crown, more than most other states. The most successful of these, Kelly Lloyd, who achieved Indiana's highest ever Miss Teen USA placement also went on to earn one of Miss Indiana USA's highest placements in 2002. Even more notable, Lloyd was a Triple Crown winner.

The current titleholder is KK Kokonaing of Huntertown and was crowned on April 10, 2022 at Noblesville High School in Noblesville. She will represent Indiana for the title of Miss Teen USA 2022.

Results summary

Placements
1st runners-up: Kelly Lloyd (1993)
3rd runners-up: Paige Robinson (2017)  
4th runners-up: Jillian Dornbush (2001)
Top 10/12: Heather Hart (1991), Nicole Llewellyn (1992), Nicolette Van Hook (1994), Kera Boog (2000)
Top 15: Jami Stallings (2003), Jessica Michelle Buch (2011), Zoe Parker (2014)
Indiana holds a record of 10 placements at Miss Teen USA.

Awards
Miss Photogenic: Jillian Dornbush (2001), Lexi Gryszowka (2021)

Winners 

1 Age at the time of the Miss Teen USA pageant

References

External links
Official website

Indiana
Women in Indiana